Milivoj Bebić (born 29 August 1959) is a retired Croatian water polo player. He won a silver Olympic gold medal winner with Yugoslavia at the 1980 Summer Olympics and a gold medal at the 1984 Summer Olympics.

He was a former waterpolo player of the POŠK team of Split (Croatia) and,  in Italy, of the Ortigia in Siracusa and Volturno Sporting Club of Santa Maria Capua Vetere (where he also worked as coach, during the '90s).

At the age of ten, Milivoj Bebić joined the Pošk water polo club. A prodigy almost from the start, he was asked to join the Yugoslavian national team at the age of 17. It was playing with experienced veterans, like Hall of Famer Ratko Rudić and playing under the legendary coach, Vahlo Orlić, father of modern Yugoslav water polo, and Miro Čirčović, that Bebić developed the skills that made him one of the greatest offensive water polo players of all time.

From 1979 to 1985, nobody was better than Bebić. He helped the Yugoslavian national team and POŠK reach the top of the podium in nearly every tournament they entered. In 1980, at the Moscow Olympics, Yugoslavia won the silver, losing to the Soviet Union by a single goal in the decisive game of the round-robin tournament. Four years later in Los Angeles, Yugoslavia again faced the home team in the deciding match and it looked like history would favor the home team once again, as the Americans held a five to three lead heading into the fourth quarter. But after Deni Lusic brought Yugoslavia to within one, it was Bebić’s goal with three minutes three seconds that tied the score and allowed Yugoslavia to win the gold medal on the basis of Yugoslavia’s better goal differential in the round-robin tournament.

During his career on the Yugoslavian national team, Bebić scored a record 620 goals in just 300 games and in 1982-1984, he was judged by “International Swimming” and “Water Polo Magazine” as the best player in the world. In 1991, he made history by becoming the first water polo player to sign a professional contract in excess of one million Deutsche Mark.

After his active career, he coached POŠK and in 1996, he was appointed director of the club, guiding the team in winning the Croatian team cups and national championships as well as the European title in 1999. He was also instrumental in reviving women’s water polo in his country.

He is currently a member of the FINA Technical Water Polo Committee (TWPC), which is the governing body for water polo in the world. He is also chairman of the Croatian water polo competition board and Croatian referee's committee.

See also
 Yugoslavia men's Olympic water polo team records and statistics
 List of Olympic champions in men's water polo
 List of Olympic medalists in water polo (men)
 List of members of the International Swimming Hall of Fame

References

External links
 

1959 births
Living people
Croatian male water polo players
Croatian water polo coaches
Yugoslav male water polo players
Olympic water polo players of Yugoslavia
Olympic gold medalists for Yugoslavia
Olympic silver medalists for Yugoslavia
Water polo players from Split, Croatia
Water polo players at the 1980 Summer Olympics
Water polo players at the 1984 Summer Olympics
Olympic medalists in water polo
Medalists at the 1984 Summer Olympics
Medalists at the 1980 Summer Olympics